Blundellsands is an area of Crosby in the ceremonial county of Merseyside, England and in the historic county of Lancashire. It is part of the Metropolitan Borough of Sefton, and a Sefton council electoral ward. At the 2001 Census the population was recorded as 11,514. This area was not measured in the 2011 Census. For current figures see Blundellsands (Ward).

Description
Blundellsands is an area north to the city of Liverpool and to the west of Crosby with Hightown and Little Crosby to the north, Great Crosby and Thornton to the east and Brighton-le-Sands and Waterloo to the south. The area is served by Blundellsands & Crosby and Hall Road railway stations. Its shoreline, the northern part of Crosby Beach, includes parts of the popular exhibit, Another Place, designed by the sculptor Antony Gormley. Several of the Gormley statues are accessible from the Burbo Bank car park. The area is generally considered to be very affluent with many local celebrities, footballers, politicians, businessmen and wealthy people in general making up the vast majority of residents calling this their home.

Education
There are several independent and public schools in the area.

History
Blundellsands was named in honour of the famous Blundell family of Little Crosby, Catholic recusants during the English Reformation, who owned the land upon which the area was built, beginning in the 1870s. Thomas Mellard Reade (1832-1909) architect laying out the Blundellsands estate in 1868. He was also a civil engineer, and geologist and worked at Liverpool University.

Sport
Blundellsands is the home of Waterloo Rugby Club and the West Lancashire Golf Club.

Notable people
Gerald Gardner, the founder of Gardnerian Wicca, a denomination of the Neopagan religion of Wicca, was born in Blundellsands in 1884, although he lived there for only a few years.

TV presenter Anne Robinson's family home was at St Michael's Rd.

See also
Listed buildings in Blundellsands

References

External links

Liverpool Street Gallery - Liverpool 23

Towns and villages in the Metropolitan Borough of Sefton
Beaches of Merseyside